Covergirl is a 1984 Canadian drama film directed by Jean-Claude Lord, about a millionaire who meets an aspiring model. After fulfilling his need to get her in bed with him, he is still dissatisfied and decides to take on a managerial role in her career. This film contains music composed by Christopher L. Stone.The film stars Jeff Conaway, Irena Ferris, Cathie Shirriff, Roberta Leighton, Deborah Wakeham and Kenneth Welsh in the lead roles.

Cast

References

External links
 

1984 films
English-language Canadian films
1984 drama films
Films shot in Montreal
Films set in Montreal
Canadian drama films
Films about modeling
New World Pictures films
1980s English-language films
1980s Canadian films
English-language drama films